Series 49 of University Challenge began on 15 July 2019 on BBC Two.

Results
Winning teams are highlighted in bold.
Teams with green scores (winners) returned in the next round, while those with red scores (losers) were eliminated.
Teams with orange scores had to win one more match to return in the next round.
Teams with yellow scores indicate that two further matches had to be played and won (teams that lost their first quarter-final match).
A score in italics indicates a match decided on a tie-breaker question.

First round

 Three teams finished tied for the last two places in the play-offs on 145 each; Durham and Jesus College Oxford went through due to having heard fewer questions to reach their scores.

Highest scoring losers play-offs

Second round

Quarterfinals

Semifinals

Final

 The trophy and title were awarded to the Imperial team comprising Richard Brooks, Brandon Blackwell (known simply as Brandon), Caleb Rich and Conor McMeel.
 The trophy was presented by Andrew Wiles, on location at the Oxford University Mathematics Institute.

Spin-off: Christmas Special 2019

First round
Each year, a Christmas special sequence is aired featuring distinguished alumni. Out of 7 first-round winners, the top 4 highest-scoring teams progress to the semi-finals. The teams consist of celebrities who represent their alma maters.
Winning teams are highlighted in bold.
Teams with green scores (winners) returned in the next round, while those with red scores (losers) were eliminated.
Teams with grey scores won their match but did not achieve a high enough score to proceed to the next round.
A score in italics indicates a match decided on a tie-breaker question.

Standings for the winners

Semi-finals

Final

The winning University of Leeds team consisted of Jonathan Clements, Henry Gee, Richard Coles and Timothy Allen beat the Wadham College, Oxford and their team of Jonathan Freedland, Tom Solomon, Anne McElvoy and Roger Mosey.

References

External links
University Challenge homepage
Blanchflower Results Table

2019
2019 British television seasons
2020 British television seasons